Brownstown is an unincorporated community in Brown County, in the U.S. state of Ohio.

History
Brownstown was platted in 1848. A post office was established at Brownstown in 1876 and remained in operation until 1905.

References

Unincorporated communities in Brown County, Ohio
1848 establishments in Ohio
Populated places established in 1848
Unincorporated communities in Ohio